Hod Hasharon Sokolov railway station is a passenger railway station located at the town boundary of Hod HaSharon and Kfar Saba, Israel. Until July 2018 it was the northern terminus of the suburban line to Beersheba via Tel Aviv. The station was opened on 2 September 2006 as Kfar Saba Merkaz; at the same time, the neighbouring Kfar Saba–Nordau railway station was renamed Hod HaSharon station. On 6 March 2010, both stations were renamed to their present names.

The station is located on Sokolov St, at the junction with HaTayasim St. In December 2006, the station served a daily average of 1860 passengers.

As part of the extending the Sharon Railway westwards, in July 2018 the rail tracks were extended to the new Ra'anana South railway station from which the railway will be extended in 2020 to the Coastal Railway. This connection will provide a shorter alternative route to Tel Aviv and also enable the possibility of trains passing through the station reaching northern destinations (such as Netanya and Haifa) on the rail network.

Train service

Ridership

Facilities 
Facilities present at the station are: 
Payphone
One ticket cashier
Two ticket machines
Escalators
Lifts
Buffet
Car park
Toilets

References

External links
Israel railways web site
On the Platform - information website

Railway stations in Central District (Israel)
Railway stations opened in 2006
2006 establishments in Israel
Hod HaSharon